The page is a list on swearing ceremony of the Prime Minister of India Narendra Modi.

Events 
First swearing-in ceremony of Narendra Modi in 2014

Second swearing-in ceremony of Narendra Modi in 2019

See also
Narendra Modi